Marc-Antoine Gagnon (born March 6, 1991) is a Canadian freestyle skier. Gagnon represented Canada at the 2014 Winter Olympics in the moguls event. He placed fourth, narrowly losing to Russia's Alexandr Smyshlyaev for the bronze medal.

References

1991 births
Living people
Canadian male freestyle skiers
Skiers from Montreal
Freestyle skiers at the 2014 Winter Olympics
Freestyle skiers at the 2018 Winter Olympics
Olympic freestyle skiers of Canada